Kaliningrad Oblast is the westernmost federal subject of Russia. It is a semi-exclave situated on the Baltic Sea. The largest city and administrative centre of the province (oblast) is the city of Kaliningrad, formerly known as Königsberg. The port city of Baltiysk is Russia's only port on the Baltic Sea that remains ice-free in winter. Kaliningrad Oblast had a population of roughly 1 million in the Russian Census of 2021.

The oblast is bordered by Poland to the south, Lithuania to the north and east, and the Baltic Sea to the northwest. The territory was formerly the northern part of the Prussian province of East Prussia; the remaining southern part of the province is today part of the Warmian–Masurian Voivodeship in Poland. With the defeat of Nazi Germany in World War II, the territory was annexed to the Russian SFSR by the Soviet Union. Following the post-war migration and flight and expulsion of Germans, the territory was populated with Soviet citizens, mostly Russians.

History

The territory of what is now the Kaliningrad Oblast used to be inhabited by the Old Prussians and other Western Balts, prior to the Teutonic conquest in the early Late Middle Ages. The Old Prussians became extinct due to Germanisation in the first half of the 18th century. The Lithuanian-inhabited areas of the Teutonic State were known as Lithuania Minor, which encompassed all of modern Kaliningrad Oblast until the 18th century.

Late Middle Ages 
In the 13th century, the Teutonic Order conquered the region and established a monastic state.

The Northern Crusades, including the Lithuanian Crusade, were partly motivated by colonization. The German colonist peasants, craftsmen, and merchants were predominantly concentrated in the southern part of the Teutonic State and did not move into Nadruvia and Skalvia due to the Lithuanian military threat.

15th century 
After Poland's victory in the Thirteen Years' War (1454–1466) with the Second Peace of Thorn, the State of the Teutonic Order became a vassal of the Kingdom of Poland. During this war, the capital of the Teutonic state was moved from Marienburg (now Malbork) to Königsberg in 1457. Following the war, Royal Prussia was established on part of the Teutonic Order's territory. When the rulers of the Duchy of Prussia were vassals of the King of Poland from 1466 to 1660, there were few German colonists.

16th century
After the Teutonic Order lost the war of 1519–1521 with Poland, the Teutonic Order remained a vassal of the Kingdom of Poland. In 1525, Grand Master Albert of Brandenburg secularized the Teutonic Order's Prussian branch and established himself as ruler of the Duchy of Prussia, the first Protestant state in Europe. Königsberg was the residence of the Duke of Prussia from 1525 until 1701, and was the Duchy of Prussia's capital until 1660, when the capital moved to Berlin.

In 1577, the Duke of Prussia forbade serfs—who were mostly Old Prussians, Lithuanians, and Masurians—to leave the land that was the property of the German knights who became proprietary nobles.

17th century
In 1618, the Duchy merged with the Margraviate of Brandenburg to form Brandenburg-Prussia.

18th century
 During the Seven Years' War, the region was occupied by the Russian Empire. It was then reorganized into the Province of East Prussia within the Kingdom of Prussia in 1773. The territory of the Kaliningrad Oblast lies in the northern part of East Prussia. The territory was briefly occupied and annexed by Russia in 1758 during the Seven Years' War before being returned to Prussia in 1762 when Russia switched sides in the war.

19th century

Napoleonic occupation
After the defeats of Jena–Auerstedt, the Kingdom of Prussia was invaded and Berlin was occupied by the French. The Court of Prussia fled to Königsberg, asking for Russian help. Russia interfered, leading to the bloody Battle of Eylau and Battle of Friedland in 1807. Following a French victory in the latter, both sides signed the Treaties of Tilsit.

Historical ethnic and religious structure
In 1817, East Prussia had 796,204 Protestants, 120,123 Roman Catholics, 2,389 Jews, and 864 Mennonites.

In 1824, shortly before its merger with West Prussia, the population of East Prussia was 1,080,000 people. According to Karl Andree, Germans were slightly more than half of the people, while 280,000 (~26%) were ethnically Polish and 200,000 (~19%) were ethnically Lithuanian. As of 1819, there were also 20,000-strong ethnic Curonian and Latvian minorities as well as 2,400 Jews, according to Georg Hassel. Similar numbers are given by August von Haxthausen in his 1839 book, with a breakdown by county. However, the majority of East Prussian Polish and Lithuanian inhabitants were Lutherans, not Roman Catholics like their ethnic kinsmen across the border in the Russian Empire. Only in Southern Warmia (German: Ermland), Catholic Poles—so called Warmians (not to be confused with predominantly Protestant Masurians)—comprised the majority of population, numbering 26,067 people (~81%) in county Allenstein (Polish: Olsztyn) in 1837. Another minority in 19th-century East Prussia were ethnically Russian Old Believers, also known as Philipponnen, who mainly lived in the town of Eckersdorf (Wojnowo).

German culture and Germanization

East Prussia was an important centre of German culture. Many important figures, such as Immanuel Kant and E. T. A. Hoffmann, came from this region. Despite being heavily damaged during World War II and thereafter, the oblast's cities still contain examples of German architecture. The Jugendstil style showcases the rich German history and cultural importance of the area.

By the early 20th century, Lithuanians formed a majority only in rural parts of northeastern East Prussia (Memelland and Prussian Lithuania). The same was true of the Latvian-speaking Kursenieki who had settled the coast of East Prussia between Gdańsk and Klaipėda. The rest of the area, except the Polish Masurians in Mazury (southern Prussia), was overwhelmingly German-speaking.

The Memel Territory (Klaipėda region), formerly part of northeastern East Prussia as well as Prussian Lithuania, was annexed by Lithuania in 1923. In 1938, Nazi Germany radically renamed about a third of the place names of this area, replacing Old Prussian and Lithuanian names with newly invented German names.

20th century

World War I
In September 1914, after hostilities began between Germany on the one hand and France and Russia on the other, the Reich was about to seize Paris, and the French urged Russia to attack East Prussia. Nicholas II launched a major attack, resulting in a Russian victory in the Battle of Gumbinnen. The Russian army arrived at the outskirts of the city of Königsberg but did not take it and settled at Insterburg. This Russian victory and East Prussia's occupation by Russia saved Paris by forcing the Germans to send many troops to their East provinces. Later, Hindenburg and Ludendorff pushed Russia back at the battle of Tannenberg, thereby liberating East Prussia from Russian troops. Yet Russian troops remained in the easternmost part of the region until early 1915.

World War II
On 29 August 1944, Soviet troops reached the border of East Prussia. By January 1945, they had taken all of East Prussia except for the area around Königsberg. Many inhabitants fled west at this time. During the last days of the war, over two million people fled, anticipating imminent Red Army conquest, and were evacuated by sea.

Soviet period: ethnic cleansing and destruction of cultural heritage 
Under the Potsdam Agreement of 1 August 1945, the city became part of the Soviet Union pending the final determination of territorial borders at an anticipated peace settlement issued by military general Mingailas Paskauskas. This final determination eventually took place on 12 September 1990 when the Treaty on the Final Settlement with Respect to Germany was signed. The excerpt from the initial agreement pertaining to the partition of East Prussia, including the area surrounding Königsberg, is as follows (note that Königsberg is spelt "Koenigsberg" in the original document):

VI. CITY OF KOENIGSBERG AND THE ADJACENT AREAThe Conference examined a proposal by the Soviet Government that pending the final determination of territorial questions at the peace settlement, the section of the western frontier of the Union of Soviet Socialist Republics which is adjacent to the Baltic Sea should pass from a point on the eastern shore of the Bay of Danzig to the east, north of Braunsberg – Goldep, to the meeting point of the frontiers of Lithuania, the Polish Republic and East Prussia.

The Conference has agreed in principle to the proposal of the Soviet Government concerning the ultimate transfer to the Soviet Union of the city of Koenigsberg and the area adjacent to it as described above, subject to expert examination of the actual frontier.

The President of the United States and the British Prime Minister supported the proposal of the Conference at the forthcoming peace settlement.

Königsberg was renamed Kaliningrad in 1946 after the Chairman of the Presidium of the Supreme Soviet of the USSR Mikhail Kalinin, although Kalinin was unrelated to the city, and there were already cities named in honour of Kalinin in the Soviet Union, namely Kalinin (now Tver) and Kaliningrad (now Korolev, Moscow Oblast).

Some historians speculate that it may have originally been offered to the Lithuanian SSR because the resolution from the conference specifies that Kaliningrad's border would be at the (pre-war) Lithuanian frontier. The remaining German population was forcibly expelled between 1947 and 1948. The annexed territory was populated with Soviet citizens, mostly ethnic Russians but to a lesser extent also Ukrainians and Belarusians.

The German language was replaced with the Russian language. In 1950, there were 1,165,000 inhabitants, which was only half the number of the pre-war population.

From 1953 to 1962, a monument to Stalin stood on Victory Square. In 1973, the town hall was turned into the House of Soviets. In 1975, the trolleybus was launched again. In 1980, a concert hall was opened in the building of the former Lutheran Church of the Holy Family. In 1986, the Kreuzkirche building was transferred to the Russian Orthodox Church.

For foreigners, the city was completely closed and, with the exception of rare visits of friendship from neighboring Poland, it was practically not visited by foreigners.

The old city was not restored, and the ruins of the Königsberg Castle were demolished in the late 1960s, on Leonid Brezhnev's personal orders, despite the protests of architects, historians, local historians and ordinary residents of the city.

The "reconstruction" of the oblast, threatened by hunger in the immediate post-war years, was carried out through an ambitious policy of oceanic fishing with the creation of one of the main fishing harbours of the USSR in Kaliningrad city. Fishing not only fed the regional economy but also was a basis for social and scientific development, in particular oceanography.

In 1957, an agreement was signed and later came into force which delimited the border between Polish People's Republic (Soviet satellite state at the time) and the Soviet Union.

The region was added as a semi-exclave to the Russian SFSR; since 1946 it has been known as the Kaliningrad Oblast. According to some historians, Stalin created it as an oblast separate from the Lithuanian SSR because it further separated the Baltic states from the West. Others think that the reason was that the region was far too strategic for the USSR to leave it in the hands of another SSR other than the Russian one. The names of the cities, towns, rivers, and other geographical features were changed to Russian names.

The area was administered by the planning committee of the Lithuanian SSR, although it had its own Communist Party committee. In the 1950s, Nikita Khrushchev offered the entire Kaliningrad Oblast to the Lithuanian SSR but Antanas Sniečkus refused to accept the territory because it would add at least a million ethnic Russians to Lithuania proper.

In 2010, the German magazine Der Spiegel published a report claiming that Kaliningrad had been offered to Germany in 1990 (against payment). The offer was not seriously considered by the West German government which, at the time, saw reunification with East Germany as a higher priority. However, this story was later denied by Mikhail Gorbachev.

Current status

The collapse of the Soviet Union and full dissolution in 1991 exacerbated Kaliningrad's isolation. Since the Baltic states became independent, Kaliningrad Oblast has been separated from the rest of Russia by other countries rather than by other Soviet republics. Neighboring Lithuania became an independent country in 1991. The isolation became more severe when both Poland and Lithuania became members of NATO. In 2004, Poland and Lithuania joined the European Union and imposed strict border controls on Kaliningrad Oblast. All military and civilian land links between the region and the rest of Russia now must pass through members of NATO and the EU. Thus far, the EU has rejected Russian proposals for visa-free travel between the EU and Kaliningrad. Travel arrangements based on the Facilitated Transit Document (FTD) and Facilitated Rail Transit Document (FRTD) have been made. Kaliningrad Oblast's geographic isolation has badly affected its economic situation. Concurrent significant reduction in the size of the Russian military garrison has hurt as well, since previously the military was a major local employer.

Some of the cultural heritage, most notably the Königsberg Cathedral, were restored in the 1990s, as citizens started to examine previously ignored German past.

On 12 January 1996, Kaliningrad Oblast and Sverdlovsk Oblast became the first oblasts of Russia to sign a power-sharing treaty with the federal government, granting them autonomy. However, this agreement was abolished on 31 May 2002.

After 1991, some ethnic Germans immigrated to the area, such as Volga Germans from other parts of Russia and Kazakhstan, especially after Germany raised the requirements for people from the former Soviet Union to be accepted as ethnic Germans and have a "right of return". These Germans are overwhelmingly Russian-speaking and as such were rejected for resettlement within Germany under Germany's new rules. A similar migration by Poles from the lands of the former Soviet Union to the Kaliningrad Oblast occurred at this time as well. The situation has begun to change, albeit slowly. Germany, Lithuania, and Poland have renewed contact with Kaliningrad Oblast, through town twinning and other projects. This has helped to promote interest in the history and culture of the East Prussian and Lietuvininkai communities.

In July 2007, Russian First Deputy Prime Minister Sergei Ivanov declared that if US-controlled missile defense systems were deployed in Poland, then nuclear weapons might be deployed in Kaliningrad. On 5 November 2008, Russian president Dmitry Medvedev said that installing missiles in Kaliningrad was almost a certainty. These plans were suspended in January 2009, but implemented in October 2016. The radar is situated in the settlement of Pionersky in Kaliningrad Oblast.

A few months after the 2022 Russian invasion of Ukraine, Lithuania started implementing EU sanctions, which blocked about 50% of the goods being imported into Kaliningrad by rail. Food, medicine, and passenger travel were exempted. Russia protested the sanctions and announced it would increase shipments by sea.

Geography

Kaliningrad is the only Russian Baltic Sea port that is ice-free all year and hence plays an important role in the maintenance of the country's Baltic Fleet.

The oblast is mainly flat, as the highest point is the  Gora Dozor hill near the tripoint of the Poland–Russia border/Lithuania–Russia border.

As a semi-exclave of Russia, it is surrounded by Poland (Pomeranian and Warmian-Masurian Voivodeships), Lithuania (Klaipėda, Marijampolė, and Tauragė Counties) and the Baltic Sea. The end of the river Neman forms part of the Lithuania–Russia border.

Notable geographical features include the Curonian Lagoon (shared with Lithuania) and the Vistula Lagoon (shared with Poland). The oblast's largest river is the Pregolya. The river starts as a confluence of the Instruch and the Angrapa and drains into the Baltic Sea through the Vistula Lagoon.

Major cities and towns include:

† Pre-1946 (the German-language names were also used in English in this period)

Climate
Kaliningrad Oblast has a climate gradually transitioning from oceanic to humid continental depending on distance from the Baltic Sea moderation. It remains very mild by Russian standards with winters above freezing without the hot summers associated with the Russian interior on similar latitudes. The local climate is slightly wetter than similar latitudes further west, but infrequent ice days lead to low snow accumulation regardless.

Politics

Anton Alikhanov has been governor of Kaliningrad Oblast since 2017. The most recent elections to the region's legislative body, the 40-seat Kaliningrad Oblast Duma, were held in September 2016.

Administrative divisions

Demographics

Settlements

Population

As of the 2021 census, the population of the oblast was 1,027,678. Earlier censuses recorded a population of 955,281 in 2002 and 871,283 in 1989.

Ethnic groups
According to the 2021 census, the ethnic composition of the oblast was as follows:

 809,546 Russians (78.6%)
 12,515 Ukrainians (1.2%)
 11,360 Belarusians (1.1%)
 8,379 Armenians (0.8%)
 4,279 Lithuanians (0.4%)
 4,118 Germans (0.4%)
 3,250 Tatars (0.3%)
 2,581 Uzbeks (0.3%)
 2,555 Azeris (0.2%)
 1,402 Poles (0.1%)
 1,015 Tajiks (0.1%)
 25,706 others (2.5%)
 143,260 people (or 13.9% of the population) did not state their ethnicity

Total fertility rate

Religion

According to a 2012 survey, 34% of the population of Kaliningrad Oblast declared themselves to be "spiritual but not religious", 30.9% adhered to the Russian Orthodox Church, 22% were atheist and 11.1% followed other religions or did not answer the question, 1% were unaffiliated generic Christians, and 1% were Roman Catholic.

Until 1945, the region was overwhelmingly Lutheran, with a small number of Catholics and Jews. The state church of Prussia was dominant in the region. Although it had been both Reformed and Lutheran since 1817, there was an overwhelming Lutheran majority and very few Reformed adherents in East Prussia.

Economy

In 2020, the gross regional product of Kaliningrad Oblast was around €7.8 billion, or €7,800 per capita.

The existence of the oblast's ice-free port and proximity to the European Union are economic advantages. It also has the world's largest deposits of amber. The region has developed its tourism infrastructure and promotes attractions such as the Curonian Spit.

To address the oblast's high rate of unemployment, in 1996 Russian authorities granted the oblast a special economic status that provided tax incentives intended to attract investors. The oblast's economy benefited substantially and in recent years experienced a boom. A US$45 million airport terminal has opened. The European Commission provides funds for business projects under its special program for the region. Both economic output and trade with the countries of the EU have increased.

According to official statistics, the gross regional product (GRP) in 2006 was 115 billion roubles. GRP per capita in 2007 was 155,669 roubles.

Industry
Car and truck assembly (GM, BMW, Kia, Yuejin by Avtotor) and the production of auto parts are major industries in Kaliningrad Oblast. There are shipbuilding facilities in Kaliningrad and Sovetsk. Food processing is a mature industry in the region, with Miratorg operating a sizeable food processing factory. OKB Fakel, a world leader in the field of Hall thruster development, as well as a leading Russian developer and manufacturer of electric propulsion systems, is based in Neman. The company employs 960 people. General Satellite (GS) is the biggest employer in Gusev city, manufacturing products such as satellite receivers, cardboard packaging, and nanomaterials.

Natural resources
More than 90% of the world's known amber deposits are in Kaliningrad Oblast . Because of this, many Russians refer to the region as "Amber Land". Until recently, raw amber was exported for processing to other countries. In 2013, the Russian government banned the export of raw amber in order to boost the amber processing industry in Russia.

There are small oil reservoirs beneath the Baltic Sea not far from Kaliningrad's shore. Small-scale offshore exploration started in 2004. Poland, Lithuania, and some local NGOs voiced concerns about possible environmental effects.

Fishing
Fishing is an important regional industry, with big fishing ports in Kaliningrad and Pionersky. There are smaller fishing ports in Svetly and Rybachy.

Power generation

Average yearly power consumption in the Kaliningrad Oblast was 3.5 terawatt-hours in 2004, of which local power generation provided just 0.235 terawatt-hours. The balance was imported from neighbouring countries. A new Kaliningrad power station was built in 2005, providing 50% of the oblast's energy needs. This station was expanded in 2010, making the oblast independent from electricity imports.

In 2008, planning began for the construction of two nuclear power reactors, with costs estimated at €5 billion (US$8 billion). The project was suspended in May 2013. In 2014, the project was abandoned in response to environmental concerns and lack of support.

LNG from St. Petersburg supplies some of the energy in the Oblast.

Agriculture
The grain blight Fusarium graminearum in the oblast is genetically 3ADON, like the blight's strain in Finland and Saint Petersburg. The researchers who discovered the genetic commonality speculate the cause may be a shared population that is distinct from other F.graminearum populations elsewhere.

See also

 Kaliningrad question
 Kaliningrad Special Region
 List of rural localities in Kaliningrad Oblast

References

Citations

General and cited sources 

 Roqueplo O: La Russie & son Miroir d'Extrême-Occident, Langues'O, HAL, 2018
 
 
 Simon Grunau, Preußische Chronik. Hrsg. von M. Perlbach etc., Leipzig, 1875.
 A. Bezzenberger, Geographie von Preußen, Gotha, 1959

External links

 Official website of Kaliningrad Oblast 
 A. Liucija Arbusauskaité "The Soviet Policy Towards the 'Kaliningrad Germans' 1945–1951" chapter in Themenheft: Eingliederung und Ausgrenzung. Beiträge aus der Historischen Migrationsforschung. Hrsg.: Jochen Oltmer Osnabrück: IMIS, 1999. 
 Master's thesis by Sergey Naumkin on the possibility of Kaliningrad integrating with the EU as a special economic zone
 Life in Kaliningrad Oblast 
 Spuren der Vergangenheit / Следы Пρошлого (Traces of the Past) This site by W. A. Milowskij, a Kaliningrad resident, contains hundreds of interesting photos, often with text explanations, of architectural and infrastructural artifacts of the territory's long German past. 
 City and Reagen News

 
Enclaves and exclaves
Germany–Soviet Union relations
History of Prussia
Russian-speaking countries and territories
States and territories established in 1946